Simon I, son of Onias I, (310–291 or 300–270 BCE) was High Priest in the Temple in Jerusalem during the Second Temple period.

Some writers identify him with Simeon the Just: the Jewish Encyclopedia (1906) names Fränkel and Grätz as examples.

Patrilineal ancestry

References

4th-century BC births
3rd-century BC deaths
3rd-century BCE High Priests of Israel